Apocera is a genus of snout moths. It was described by William Schaus in 1912.

Species
 Apocera colorata (Dyar, 1914)
 Apocera costata Schaus, 1912
 Apocera vincentia (Schaus, 1922)
 Apocera zographica (Dyar, 1913)

References

Epipaschiinae
Pyralidae genera